This is a list of utilities for performing data erasure.

References

See also 
 List of data recovery software

Computer security software

 
Lists of software